Masuyite is a uranium/lead oxide mineral with formula Pb[(UO2)3O3(OH)2]·3H2O.

Masuyite was first described in 1947 for an occurrence in Katanga and named to honor Belgian geologist Gustave Masuy (1905–1945).

See also

 Classification of minerals
 List of minerals

References

Uranium(VI) minerals
Lead minerals
Oxide minerals
Monoclinic minerals
Minerals in space group 7